A state education agency or state department of education is the state-level government organization within each U.S. state or territory responsible for education, including providing information, resources, and technical assistance on educational matters to schools and residents.

In all states but Hawaii, primary and secondary education (collectively known as K–12) are provided by school districts, while the state education agency handles only matters of statewide concern such as curriculum standards.  In the state of Hawaii and all inhabited federal territories, the state education agency or the equivalent territorial government agencies are responsible for directly operating primary and secondary schools. 

Different U.S. states use different job titles for the person in charge of education in the state government. These titles include Secretary of Education, State Superintendent of Education, Superintendent of Public Instruction, Commissioner of Education, and Director of Education. Thirteen states have an education executive directly elected by voters, but in most states they are appointed, by the governor, state legislature, or a state board.

State education agencies (SEAs)
The following are state education agencies as identified by the Council of Chief State School Officers.

See also
National Association of State Boards of Education, United States
No Child Left Behind, United States federal law
School district
Standardized test

Notes

References

External links
Education Governance Models Updated and Revised by Mary Fulton
 State Education Agencies - Contact information for every SEA in the US.

State superintendents of public instruction of the United States